John Derek Taylor, Baron Taylor of Holbeach, 
 (born 12 November 1943) is a British Conservative politician and former Government Chief Whip in the House of Lords.

Biography
Taylor is the son of Percy Otto Taylor and Ethel Brocklehurst. He was educated at Holbeach Primary School in Holbeach, Lincolnshire, St. Felix School in Felixstowe, and at Bedford School in the county town of Bedfordshire.

He served on the executive committee of the East Midlands Conservative Council from 1966 to 1998, and contested the Parliamentary constituency of Chesterfield in the general elections of February and October 1974. He later held many roles within the voluntary wing of the Conservative Party and was created a Commander of the Order of the British Empire in 1992 for political service. He served as chairman of the National Conservative Convention from 2000 to 2003. He was created a life peer as Baron Taylor of Holbeach, of South Holland in the county of Lincolnshire, on 31 May 2006. He is an honorary member of Conservative Friends of Poland. Taylor was appointed junior minister at the Department for Environment, Food and Rural Affairs in September 2011, and moved in September 2012 to a ministerial post at the Home Office as Parliamentary Under-Secretary of State for Criminal Information.

On 6 August 2014, in a mini-reshuffle prompted by the resignation of Baroness Warsi, Lord Taylor was appointed to the post of Captain of the Honourable Corps of Gentlemen-at-Arms and chief whip in the House of Lords, continuing in that office until the end of the Second May ministry.

References

|-

|-

|-

1943 births
Commanders of the Order of the British Empire
Conservative Party (UK) Baronesses- and Lords-in-Waiting
Conservative Party (UK) life peers
Honourable Corps of Gentlemen at Arms
Living people
People educated at Bedford School
People from Holbeach
Members of the Privy Council of the United Kingdom
Life peers created by Elizabeth II